Wyatt Rice is an American guitarist and bluegrass musician. He is best known for his solo albums and his work in his brother's group the Tony Rice Unit.

Biography 

Rice was born in Long Beach, California but grew up in Florida and other locations. He began playing guitar at age six, learning from his father Herb Rice. He also played alto saxophone, bassoon, and bass in his school marching band.

At age 17, Rice moved from Florida to California to be a member of his brother Tony Rice's band, the Tony Rice Unit.

In 1990, Rice released his all-instrumental solo album New Market Gap on the Rounder Records label with help from Rickie Simpkins (fiddle), Sammy Shelor (banjo), Ray Legere (mandolin), and Ron Rice (bass).

Rice formed his own band Santa Cruz in 1995 and in 1996, released the album Picture in a Tear. Personnel included Elmer Burchett (banjo), Ricky Riddle (mandolin), Junior Sisk (guitar), and Timmy Massey (bass).

Rice joined Ronnie Bowman’s band The Committee in 2003 along with Andy Hall (resonator guitar), Jeremy Garrett (fiddle), Jessie Cobb (Mandolin) Mike Anglin (bass) and Garnet Imes Bowman (harmony vocals).

In 2013, Rice began touring with fellow flatpicking guitarist Richard Bennett.

In 2016, Rice and Dan Menzone released the Something Out of the Blue album on the Mountain Fever Records as the Wyatt Rice and Dan Menzone Alliance. Other artists involved include Rob Ickes (dobro), Fred Carpenter (fiddle), Adam Steffey (mandolin), and Ron Rice (bass). Donna Hughes wrote the lead-off song, "Lonesome Highway" which was sung by Russell Moore and Dale Ann Bradley.

Wyatt recorded the music instruction DVD “Advanced Bluegrass Rhythm Guitar” for Flatpicking Guitar Magazine, with Rickie Simpkins, Kenny Smith, Sammy Shelor, and Tony Rice. Rice also operates Rice Recording Studio, and currently serves as an adjunct faculty member at East Tennessee State University, teaching Guitar.

Rice is also a member of the Crooked Road Guitar Masters, along with Claiborne Woodall, Josh Pickett, and Sammy Shelor.

Discography

Solo albums
 1990: New Market Gap (Rounder)
 1996: Picture in a Tear (Rounder) with Santa Cruz

With Tony Rice
 1982: Backwaters (Rounder)
 1983: Church Street Blues (Sugar Hill)
 1986: Me & My Guitar (Rounder)
 1991: Native American (Rounder)
 1996: Tony Rice Sings Gordon Lightfoot (Rounder)
 2000: Unit of Measure (album) (Rounder)
 2003: Tony Rice Guitar Method - Instructional Video (Homespun)
 2014: [[Tony Rice: The Video Collection DVD]] (Rounder)

Larry and Wyatt Rice
 1994: Larry and Wyatt Rice (Pinecastle)

The Rice Brothers
 1989: The Rice Brothers (Rounder)
 1994: The Rice Brothers 2 (Rounder)

Wyatt Rice and Rickie Simpkins
 2001: New Acoustic Christmas (FGM)
 2005: Pickin’ on Martina McBride (CMH)
 2005: Pickin’ on Vince Gill (CMH)
 2006: Pickin’ on Van Zant (CMH)

Wyatt Rice, David Grier, and Kenny Smith
 2002: Live in Concert DVD (Flatpicking Guitar Magazine)

The Dan Menzone and Wyatt Rice Alliance
 2016: Something Out of the Blue (Mountain Fever)

Also appears on
 1986: Larry Rice - Hurricanes and Daydreams (Rebel)
 1989: Bill Emerson and Pete Goble - Dixie in My Eye (Webco)
 1990: Larry Rice - Artesia (Rebel)
 1990: Once Again From the Top Volumes One and Two (Hay Holler Records)
 1991: Bill Emerson - Reunion (Pinecastle)
 1991: David Grier - Freewheeling (Rounder)
 1994: Emerson and Taylor - Appaloosa (Pinecastle)
 1996: Bill Emerson - Banjo Man (Pinecastle)
 1997: Rickie Simpkins - Dancing on the Fingerboard (Pinecastle)
 2002: Rickie Simpkins - Don't Fret It (Doobie Shea)
 2004: Melonie Cannon - Melonie Cannon (Skaggs Family)
 2005: Ronnie Bowman - It's Gettin' Better All the Time (Koch)
 2005: Larry Rice - Clouds Over Carolina (Rebel)
 2006: Jimmy Gaudreau - In Good Company (CMH)
 2007: Donna Hughes - Gaining Wisdom (Rounder)
 2007: Steep Canyon Rangers - Lovin' Pretty Women (Rebel)
 2008: Melonie Cannon - And the Wheel Turns (Rural Rhythm)
 2008: Tim Hensley - Long Monday (Rural Rhythm)
 2008: Junior Sisk - Blue Side of the Blue Ridge (Rebel)
 2012: Alan Bibey and Wayne Benson - The Mandolin Chronicles (Pinecastle)
 2017: Mike Bentley - All I've Got (Union House)

Music Instruction
 2000: Advanced Bluegrass Rhythm Guitar'' DVD (Flatpicking Guitar Magazine)

Awards
 IBMA Instrumental Group of the Year – The Tony Rice Unit – 1991, 1995
 IBMA Recorded Event of the Year award for "What'll I Do" - Terry Baucom - 2013.

References

External links 
 
 
 

1965 births
Living people
People from Long Beach, California
American acoustic guitarists
American male guitarists
American bluegrass guitarists
American male singers
Rebel Records artists
Rounder Records artists
Country musicians from California
Songwriters from California
Guitarists from Los Angeles
20th-century American guitarists
20th-century American male musicians
American male songwriters